Armin Bačinović (born 24 October 1989) is a Slovenian football midfielder who most recently played for Sambenedettese.

Club career

Early career in Slovenia
Bačinović started his career at Železničar Maribor and was later transferred to NK Maribor youth sides. He signed his first professional contract in 2007. Bačinović made his first team debut on 7 July 2007 as a late substitute in an Intertoto Cup tie with Hajduk Kula. His first start came later that season in Slovenian PrvaLiga match, a 1–1 draw with Nafta Lendava.

On 14 August 2010 he has made his 100th appearance for Maribor.

Palermo and loans
On 27 August 2010 it was confirmed that Palermo had acquired Bačinović and teammate Josip Iličić from Maribor in a permanent move; the move was finalized the very next day after Palermo had eliminated Maribor from the 2010–11 UEFA Europa League in a 5–3 aggregate win, which was also the latest appearance for both players in purple jersey. Despite his young age and lack of experience in Italian football, Bačinović immediately established himself as a key player in the Sicilians' midfield line in a 4–3–2–1 scheme together with Antonio Nocerino and Giulio Migliaccio, and scored his first goal for Palermo on 17 October 2010 against Bologna.

On 20 June 2011, he signed a new five-year contract with Palermo.

In July 2012, Palermo loaned Bačinović to Serie B club Verona. He played only a handful games during the season and left Verona by the end of the season to come back at Palermo. After a disappointing first half of season at Palermo, he was deemed surplus to requirements and excluded from the squad list after the club failed to sell him during the 2014 winter transfer window.

Virtus Lanciano
On 21 August 2014 it was confirmed Bačinović had mutually rescinded his contract with Palermo, thus ending a four-year spell with the Sicilians. Later on the same day, Serie B club Virtus Lanciano announced to have signed him as a free transfer on a three-year deal.

Ternana and Sambenedettese
After finding himself without a club following the cancellation of Virtus Lanciano, on 19 August 2016 Bačinović agreed a one-year contract with another Serie B club, Ternana.

On 31 January 2017, he left Ternana to accept a permanent deal with Lega Pro club Sambenedettese

International career
Bačinović made ten appearances for Slovenia U21 and scored one goal. On 12 August 2009, he made his full international debut for Slovenia at Ljudski vrt, Maribor in a 2010 FIFA World Cup qualification match against San Marino.

Career statistics

See also
Slovenian international players
List of NK Maribor players

References

External links
Player profile at NZS 

1989 births
Living people
Slovenian people of Bosnia and Herzegovina descent
Sportspeople from Maribor
Slovenian footballers
Association football midfielders
Slovenian expatriate footballers
Slovenian expatriate sportspeople in Italy
Expatriate footballers in Italy
Slovenian PrvaLiga players
Serie A players
Serie B players
NK Maribor players
Palermo F.C. players
Hellas Verona F.C. players
Ternana Calcio players
Slovenia under-21 international footballers
Slovenia international footballers
Slovenia youth international footballers